The 2012 Point Optical Curling Classic was held from September 21 to 24 at the Nutana Curling Club in Saskatoon, Saskatchewan as part of the 2012–13 World Curling Tour. The event was held in a triple knockout format, with the purse for the event being CAD$50,000. The winning team of John Epping received CAD$12,000 for their win.

Teams
The teams are listed as follows:

Knockout Brackets

A Event

B Event

C Event

Playoffs

References

External links

Point Optical Curling Classic
2012 in Canadian curling
2012 in Saskatchewan